Justin Watson may refer to:
 Justin Watson (running back) (born 1975)
 Justin Watson (wide receiver) (born 1996)
 Justin Watson (cricketer) (born 1998)